Manoj Nandam is a South Indian actor working predominantly in Telugu films. Rising to fame as a child actor with Athadu and Chatrapathi, he has continued to play a number of lead roles.

Personal life

Manoj Nandam was born in Vijayawada and moved to Hyderabad for education. He has a computer science engineering degree from JNTU College, Hyderabad. He has a passion for dance and has performed in over 150 shows around the country. While maintaining an interest in acting, he has also become a trained dancer and martial artist.

Career
Rising into fame as a child artist in films like Athadu (2005) and Chhatrapati (2005), Manoj Nandam went on to play the lead roles in many films. His promising performances often got him pivotal roles such as a militant in Operation Gold Fish (2019) and student leader in George Reddy (2019). A critic from Telangana Today wrote that "Manoj Nandam too is impressive with the role of Arjun" in George Reddy.

He is currently busy in upcoming projects with Deva Katta - Sai Dharam Tej film, Sumanth Akkineni's next film, Aadi Sai Kumar's latest thriller and others.

Filmography

As Child Artist

As Adult Actor

References

External links 

Living people
Male actors in Telugu cinema
Indian male child actors
Indian male film actors
21st-century Indian actors
1990 births
Telugu male actors